Callidrepana argyrobapta is a moth in the family Drepanidae first described by Max Gaede in 1914. It is found in Cameroon.

References

Endemic fauna of Cameroon
Moths described in 1914
Drepaninae